Helena of Bulgaria, Empress of Serbia (c. 1315–1374) was a Bulgarian princess, and the Queen and Empress consort of Serbia by marriage to Serbian King and later Emperor Stefan Dušan (r. 1331–55). She was a regent of Serbia between 1355 and 1356 for her son Stefan Uroš V.

Life
She was the daughter of despot Sratsimir and Keratsa Petritsa of the Shishman family, a descendant of Tsar Ivan Asen II. She was the sister of tsar (emperor) Ivan Alexander of Bulgaria, Ivan-Alexander, John Komnenos, Michael and Theodora. 

Stefan Dušan was crowned King of Serbia at Svrčin on 8 September 1331 (Nativity of the Theotokos).  A year later, most likely 26 April 1332 (Thomas Sunday), Dušan married Helena. Previously, it was erroneously assumed that the marriage took place on Easter (19 April), however, marriages are not instituted on Easter in the Orthodox Church. Their wedding night was held at the royal court in Skopje. The marriage was arranged as part of the peace agreement between Bulgaria and Serbia. 

This marriage provided one son, Stefan Uroš V, and possibly one daughter, Irina. According to John V. A. Fine, she is the same "Irene" who was wife of Gregorios Preljub, the Serbian governor of Thessaly who died in late 1355 or early 1356. They were parents to Thomas II Preljubović, Ruler of Epirus from 1367 to 1384. Irene married secondly to Radoslav Hlapen, lord of Kastoria and Edessa.

Helena lived in the Republic of Venice in 1350. On her husband's death in 1355, Helena inherited part of Bulgarian lands between the lower Vardar and the Mesta. She also received the Chalcidic peninsula, basing her court at Serres. She was a regent of Serbia between 1355 and 1356 for her son. 

In 1359, Helena became a nun under the monastic name Jelisaveta. However, she continued to play an active role in politics, governing the region of Serres until 1365. After that, she retired from political life, overseeing reconstruction and renovation of several monastic communities, until her death in 1374. Queen Helena died on November 7, 1374, the date of her death is given in a Hilendar manuscript.

Legacy
After her death, she was canonized as a saint under the name of St. Elizabeth and her relics are venerated. According to the Bulgarian historian Plamen Pavlov, today one of her hands is kept in silver box in the Savina monastery near the town of Herceg Novi on the Bay of Kotor in Montenegro and is virtually unknown in Bulgaria. The relics ended up there in 1759, and before that it is possible that they were in the monastery Tvrdoš Monastery near Trebinje in Bosnia and Herzegovina.

References

Sources

External links

 

14th-century Serbian royalty
14th-century Bulgarian people
Bulgarian princesses
14th-century women rulers
Medieval Serbian royal consorts
14th-century births
1374 deaths
Sratsimir dynasty
History of Serres
Medieval Macedonia
14th-century Serbian women
14th-century Serbian people
14th-century Bulgarian women
Regents of Serbia